Stephen J. Friedman (born March 19, 1938) is the former commissioner of the United States Securities and Exchange Commission, and seventh president of Pace University from 2007 to 2017. Prior to that, Friedman has served as dean of the Pace Law School, and senior partner and co-chairman of Debevoise & Plimpton. On February 1, 2017, Friedman urged New York to increase student financial aid to both public and private universities.

In 1959, Friedman earned an AB from Princeton University's Woodrow Wilson School of Public and International Affairs. In 1962, he earned a JD from Harvard Law School, where he was an editor of the Harvard Law Review and a recipient of the Sears Prize. After law school, he served as a law clerk to Justice William J. Brennan, Jr. of the U.S. Supreme Court.

See also 
 List of law clerks of the Supreme Court of the United States (Seat 3)

References

External links
 Biographical Sketch of Stephen J. Friedman
 C-Span videos of Stephen J. Friedman

20th-century American Jews
Harvard Law School alumni
Princeton School of Public and International Affairs alumni
Pace University faculty
Law clerks of the Supreme Court of the United States
Members of the U.S. Securities and Exchange Commission
1938 births
Living people
Presidents of Pace University
Carter administration personnel
Reagan administration personnel
21st-century American Jews